Bwyd Time is the third full album by Gorky's Zygotic Mynci. It was released in 1995 and was the band's last album for Ankst. It features, amongst others, Anthony Saffery from Cornershop, who plays sitar on several tracks.

Track listing
"Bwyd Time"
"Miss Trudy"
"Paid Cheto ar Pam"
"Oraphis yn Delphie"
"Eating Salt is Easy"
"Gewn ni Gorffen"
"Iechyd Da"
"Ymwelwyr a Gwrachod"
"The Telescope and the Bonfire"
"The Man with Salt Hair"
"The Game of Eyes"
"Blood Chant"
"Ffarm-wr"
Japanese bonus track

Personnel

Gorky's Zygotic Mynci
Euros Childs - vocals, piano, organ, synthesizer, piano strings, cello (3), percussion
John Lawrence - guitar, vocals, recorder, piano (4, 11, 12), organ (4, 9), trombone (4), saxophone (10), bass (10), harmonium (9), shawm (10), percussion
Richard James - bass, percussion, vocals (5), guitar (5), organ (7)
Megan Childs - violin, viola, vocals
Euros Rowlands - drums, backing vocals (7)
Gorwel Owen - synthesizers (1,8,9,13), celeste (7)
Alan Holmes - vocals (1,2,3,7), piano strings (2), percussion (4)
Anthony Saffery - sitar
Judith Sturm - flute
Emyr Glyn Williams - trumpet (4)
Rheinallt H. Rowlands - vocals and guitar (7)
Evan Warren - poetry (10)
Clive Mayall - spoken word (10)

Some probably fictional credits are on the album sleeve:

Ricky Ronco (probably Euros Childs) - vocals, synth, whistle (1)
Stevie Ronco (probably John Lawrence) - synth bass, slap guitar, slap vocals (1)
Bwyd Time Male Voice Choir - choir (5,12)
The Elves - vocals (11)
All of the band and some of the guests are credited with various heavy artillery on (10) including tanks and nuclear weapons.

References

External links
Album page at Euros Childs's official website

Gorky's Zygotic Mynci albums
1995 albums